Martín Galmarini (born February 28, 1982) is an Argentine footballer, who currently plays for Argentine Primera División club Tigre as a right-back.

Career

Born in San Isidro, Galmarini started his career with Tigre in 2002 while the club were playing in the regionalised 3rd division of Argentine football (Primera B Metropolitana).

Tigre had a very successful season in 2004-2005 winning both the Apertura and Clausura to secure automatic promotion to the 2nd Division. Two years later Tigre secured another promotion, returning to the top flight of Argentine football for the first time since 1980.

During the opening round of fixtures for the Apertura 2007 Galmarini scored Tigre's first goal in the Primera for 27 years in a 0-1 away win against Gimnasia y Esgrima La Plata. Tigre went on to finish in 2nd place, the highest league finish in the club's history, with Galmarini featuring in all 19 games.

At the end of Cluasura 2008 Galmarini joined Argentine giants River Plate. However, he returned to Tigre for the 2010–11 Argentine Primera División season.

Personal life
Galmarini's parents are active in politics in Buenos Aires Province as part of the Justicialist Party, as are his siblings, Sebastián and Malena.

Honours

References

External links

Football lineups player profile
 Argentine Primera statistics
 CA Tigre player profile 

1982 births
Living people
Argentine footballers
Argentine expatriate footballers
People from San Isidro, Buenos Aires
Sportspeople from Buenos Aires Province
Association football midfielders
Club Atlético Tigre footballers
Club Atlético River Plate footballers
Atlante F.C. footballers
Argentine Primera División players
Primera Nacional players
Liga MX players
Argentine expatriate sportspeople in Mexico
Expatriate footballers in Mexico